The cabinet of FW de Klerk was in office from 16 August 1989 to 11 May 1994.

Cabinet

Government of South Africa
Executive branch of the government of South Africa
Cabinets of South Africa
1989 establishments in South Africa
1994 disestablishments in South Africa
Cabinets established in 1989
Cabinets disestablished in 1994